Blaž Kavčič was the defending champion but lost in the second round.
João Sousa defeated Wayne Odesnik 3–6, 6–3, 6–4 in the final to win the title.

Seeds

Draw

Finals

Top half

Bottom half

References
 Main Draw
 Qualifying Draw

Franken Challengeandnbsp;- Singles
2013 Singles